Windows 10 Mobile is a discontinued mobile operating system developed by Microsoft. It was released to manufacturing on November 20, 2015, and was made generally available on March 17, 2016. In October 2017, Microsoft announced that it would pause the active development of Windows 10 Mobile, and future development will be limited to maintenance releases and security patches. The last feature update is the Fall Creators Update. The last version of Windows 10 Mobile reached the end of life on January 14, 2020. Development for Windows 10 Mobile has completely ceased since then.

Version history

Version 1511 (November Update) 
Windows 10 Mobile November Update, also known as version 1511 and codenamed "Threshold 2", is the first major update to Windows 10 Mobile and the only one in a series of updates under the "Threshold" codenames. It carries the build number 10.0.10586. It was released to the public on November 12, 2015.

The update reached end of service on January 9, 2018.

Version 1607 (Anniversary Update) 
Windows 10 Mobile Anniversary Update, also known as version 1607 and codenamed "Redstone 1", is the second major update to Windows 10 Mobile and the first in a series of updates under the "Redstone" codenames. It carries the build number 10.0.14393. The first preview was released on February 19, 2016. It was released to the public on August 16, 2016.

The update reached end of service after the release of build 14393.2551 on October 9, 2018.

Version 1703 (Creators Update) 
Windows 10 Mobile Creators Update also known as version 1703 and codenamed "Redstone 2", is the third major update to Windows 10 Mobile and the second in a series of updates under the "Redstone" codenames. It carries the build number 10.0.15063. The first preview was released to Insiders on August 17, 2016. It was released to the public on April 25, 2017.

The update reached end of service after the release of build 15063.1868 on June 11, 2019.

Version 1709 (Fall Creators Update) 
Windows 10 Mobile Fall Creators Update, also known as version 1709 and codenamed "Redstone 3", is the third major update to Windows 10 Mobile and the third in a series of updates under the "Redstone" codenames. It carries the build number 10.0.15254. Despite sharing the same codename and version number with the PC version of Windows 10 Fall Creators Update ("Redstone 3"), the update is still in build part of the "Redstone 2" branch. The first preview was released to Insiders on April 14, 2017. It was released to the public on October 24, 2017.

The update reached end of service after the release of build 15254.603 on January 14, 2020.

See also
 Windows 10 PC version history
 Windows Phone version history

References

 
History of Microsoft
Lists of operating systems
Software version histories
Mobile operating systems